The B.League is a professional men's basketball league that began in Japan in September 2016. The league is operated by the Japan Professional Basketball League and was formed as a result of a merger between the National Basketball League that was operated by the FIBA-affiliated Japan Basketball Association and the independently operated bj league. The merger had been mandated by FIBA as a condition to Japan having its membership resumed following suspension in November 2014.

History 
The Japan Basketball Association was formed in 1930 and has operated Japan's top basketball leagues under various names since 1967. Throughout the history of the association, teams have been affiliated with large corporations and players have been employed by their respective owner company rather than competing as professional basketball players. In the early 1990s soccer in Japan moved away from a similar corporate structure and launched the J.League in 1993. The JBA commenced investigating the professionalization of basketball in the same year, and in 1997 lifted the ban on professional players. Despite this, the structure of the Japan Super League remained amateur in nature, with most teams remaining under the control of a corporate sponsor/owner.

In 2005 a rival bj league was launched in competition with the Super League, based on an American franchise system of professional teams. In response, the JBA re-launched the Super League as the Japan Basketball League in 2007, but there was still a mixture of professional and corporate teams in the competition. The JBL was again rebranded as the National Basketball League in 2013. Since the establishment of the bj league in 2005, both competitions rapidly expanded the number of teams, with 45 teams participating between the two competitions in 2015.

FIBA, the international governing body for basketball, grew concerned with the division and disorganization of the sport within the country. After the JBA failed to comply with deadlines to commence reorganizing the domestic leagues, FIBA suspended Japan from international competitions in November 2014. A task force to investigate the reformation of the domestic leagues was formed and Saburō Kawabuchi was appointed co-chairman. In May 2015, upon FIBA's recommendation, Kawabuchi was appointed as president of the JBA. The merger of the two competing leagues into the B.League was announced in June 2015 and the international suspension was lifted by FIBA in August. Telecommunications company Softbank were named as the league's top sponsor for the inaugural season in March 2016.

The 2016–17 season commenced with an inaugural match between four-time JBL/NBL champions Alvark Tokyo, who finished on top of the NBL ladder in 2015–16, and four-time bj-league champions Ryukyu Golden Kings, who won the 2015–16 bj-league championship, at Yoyogi National Gymnasium on 22 September 2016. A full round of games involving all other teams commenced on September 24.

Since the 2021–22 season, the winners and runners-up of each season qualify for the East Asia Super League.

Season format
The league consists of two divisions, named B1 and B2. For the 2022–23 season, the first division (B1) has 24 teams and the second division (B2) has 14 teams, with a system of promotion and relegation between these two divisions. Each of the first two divisions is further divided into two conferences, East and West.

First Division (B1)
In the first division, each team plays a 60-game regular-season schedule that consists of 36 games against teams within their conference (4 games against each team) and 24 games against teams in the other conference (2 games against eight teams and 4 games against the remaining two teams). Eight teams qualify for the playoffs, including the top three teams from each conference, and the next two teams with the best records, regardless of their conference, as wild cards. The playoffs consist of the quarterfinal, semifinal, and final rounds, with a best-of-three format in each round. Each round is played at the team's home court, which finished with the higher winning percentage during the season.

Second Division (B2)
In the second division, the regular season will also consist of a 60-game schedule, but with 42 games against teams within their own conference (6 games against each team) and 18 games against teams in the other conference (2 games against seven teams and 4 games against the remaining team). The playoff qualification and match format is identical to the first division: Eight teams qualify for the playoffs, which includes the top three teams from each conference, and the next two teams with the best records, regardless of their conference, as wild cards. The playoffs consist of quarterfinal, semifinal, and final rounds, with a best-of-three format in each round. Each round is played at the home court of the team that finished with the higher winning percentage during the season.

Promotion and relegation 
The B.League typically holds promotion-relegation playoffs each year to determine which second division teams will be promoted to the first division and which first division teams will be relegated to the second division for the following season. For the 2020-21 season, it was announced that the top two teams from the second division will be automatically promoted to the first division. Other promotions and relegations will not take place.

Current clubs 
In the 2014–15 season, there were 12 teams in the NBL, 10 teams in the National Basketball Development League (NBDL, the NBL's second division league) and 24 teams in the bj-league. All 46 teams sought entrance to the B.League's inaugural 2016–17 season, along with the Wakayama Trians, who withdrew from the NBL in January 2015 due to financial difficulty. Ultimately, all clubs were accepted into the league except for the Trians and the Hiroshima Lightning, who were in their first season as a bj-league expansion club. The allocation of the 45 teams into three divisions was announced in two phases in July and August 2015. In April 2016 the league announced rules regarding official team names, shortened names and abbreviations to be used by the clubs. A list of names to be used by each club in the 2016–17 season was also published. Beginning in the 2020–21 season, the B.League was reformatted to only have two conferences each, East and West, in the first and second divisions. However, the first division reverted back to a three-conference system, East, Central, and West, beginning in the 2022-23 season.

First division (24 teams)

Second division (14 teams)

Third division (16 teams)

Team Maps

Champions and finals 
Numbers in brackets denote the team's seed in its conference from the regular season.

First division finals

Second division finals

Rules

Foreign players
Each club in the first and second divisions will be allowed up to three registered foreign players, excluding one foreign-born player who has become a naturalized Japanese citizen.
Two foreign players  will be allowed on the court. 
Naturalized players can play as  Japanese citizens and have no limitations. Each club will be allowed one naturalized player.

In line with Japan Basketball Association regulations, foreign citizens who were either born or raised in Japan and graduated from Japanese elementary and junior high school will not be treated as a foreign player for the purpose of these rules.

References

External links
 Yahoo Japan Sportsnavi Basketball

 
Basketball leagues in Japan
2015 establishments in Japan
Sports leagues established in 2015
Professional sports leagues in Japan